Paulo André Cren Benini (born 20 August 1983) is a Brazilian former professional footballer who played as a central defender.

Club career
Paulo André Cren Benini began his football career playing for the São Paulo youth team, however he was unable to impress the coaching staff and was dismissed by the club. He would go to the youth teams of CSA, Águas de Lindóia as well as having a trial with Scottish club Rangers F.C. in 2002, under manager Alex McLeish before he joined Série A club Guarani who promoted him to their senior side. While Paulo André would go on to establish himself within the club he was unfortunately part of the squad that was relegated at the end of the 2004 league campaign. Despite this disappointment Paulo André had impressed Atlético Paranaense who gave him another chance at the top tier when they signed him before the start of the 2005 league campaign.

In his debut season for Atlético Paranaense Paulo André would soon establish himself a vital member of the team's defense and helped guide the club to qualify for the 2006 Copa Sudamericana. After having a personally successful debut season he would spark foreign interests and French Ligue 1 club Le Mans signed Paulo André in June 2006 on a four and half years deal. This would see Paulo André make his league debut for Le Mans on 19 August 2006 against Valenciennes FC in a 3–2 victory, however after only three further games Paulo André was struck with a patellar tendon injury in his right knee. The injury would require three surgeries and Paulo André missing the whole of the 2007–08 Ligue 1 campaign. On his return within the 2008–09 Ligue 1 campaign he was able to play in 31 games throughout the season until on 4 August 2009 Brazilian club Sport Club Corinthians Paulista signed Paulo André from Le Mans on a single season loan.

The following season Corinthians would make Paulo André a permanent member of the squad and while he was initially used as a squad player by the 2011 league campaign he would start to establish himself within the starting eleven and went on to win the Campeonato Brasileiro Série A championship with the club. This would then be followed by the club winning the 2012 Copa Libertadores and 2012 FIFA Club World Cup.

On 12 February 2014, Corinthians officially confirmed Paulo André's departure to Chinese Super League side Shanghai Greenland Shenhua.

On 10 February 2015, after a year playing in China, Paulo André joined Cruzeiro.

Career statistics

Honours

Club
Corinthians
 Campeonato Brasileiro Série A: 2011
 Copa Libertadores: 2012
 FIFA Club World Cup: 2012
 Campeonato Paulista: 2013
 Recopa Sudamericana: 2013

Athletico Paranaense
 Campeonato Paranaense: 2016, 2019
 Copa Sudamericana: 2018

Individual
Bola de Prata: 2011

References

External links
 

1983 births
Living people
Sportspeople from Campinas
Brazilian people of Italian descent
Brazilian footballers
Association football defenders
Campeonato Brasileiro Série A players
Campeonato Brasileiro Série B players
Guarani FC players
Club Athletico Paranaense players
Sport Club Corinthians Paulista players
Cruzeiro Esporte Clube players
Ligue 1 players
Le Mans FC players
Chinese Super League players
Shanghai Shenhua F.C. players
Copa Libertadores-winning players
Brazilian expatriate footballers
Brazilian expatriate sportspeople in France
Brazilian expatriate sportspeople in China
Expatriate footballers in France
Expatriate footballers in China